Armenia has a multi-party system. After latest constitutional reforms, only a legislature is elected on the national level.

Electoral system of the National Assembly
The National Assembly consists of at least 101 seats. Following electoral system amendments introduced in April 2021, members of parliament are elected only through closed party lists by party list proportional representation method.

Four mandates are reserved for national minorities, provided they are included in corresponding section of party lists. Any top segment of a party list can not include over 70% of representatives of the same sex.

Parties need to pass a 5% threshold, while alliances (blocs) must pass 7% to be included in mandate distribution.

If neither party wins over 50% of mandates in the first round and no coalition with sufficient mandates is established within 6 days after the election results are announced, a second round of elections will be carried out on 28th day from the first round of voting. The two best-performing political forces are allowed to participate in the second round. All mandates received following the first round will be preserved. The party (or a newly formed coalition) which wins the second round of elections will be given additional number of mandates to reach 54% of all seats (provided the newly formed coalition does not already have over 54% of mandates from the results of the first round).

If any party or bloc wins over 2/3 of mandates, sufficient additional mandates are distributed among all other political forces represented in the parliament to ensure that at least 1/3 of all seats are held by forces other than the winning one.

Since the requirement of assignment of 1/3 of all mandates to non-ruling parties is stipulated by the Constitution, some argue, that when withdrawal of oppositional MPs leads to violation of that rule, the ruling party shall be forced to call new snap elections. This is however, not a consensus opinion and could be dealt with in Constitutional Court.

Due to additional seats given either to the winning political force or other ones, the total number of seats in the National Assembly can grow above the minimal count and even exceed 200 in rare circumstances.

Latest national elections

2021 Armenian parliamentary election

Latest presidential elections

Latest local elections 

 2018 Yerevan city council elections
 2017 Yerevan city council elections

Upcoming elections 

The next Armenian parliamentary election is scheduled to occur in 2026.

See also

 Central Electoral Commission of Armenia
 Elections in Artsakh
 Electoral calendar
 Electoral system
 List of political parties in Armenia
 Politics in Armenia
 Programs of political parties in Armenia

Notes

References

External links
Adam Carr's Election Archive
Central Electoral Commission of Armenia

 
Elections in Asia
Elections in Europe